Băneasa is a borough in the north side of Bucharest, in Sector 1, near the Băneasa Lake. Like all north-side districts of Bucharest, it is relatively sparsely populated, with large areas of parkland. Bordering on Băneasa Forest, Băneasa has the Aurel Vlaicu International Airport, used mainly by low-cost carriers, and is home to Zoo Băneasa, the Băneasa railway station, and the Băneasa Shopping City.

In the 2000s, the area has become increasingly upmarket, due to the construction of various luxury apartment developments in and around it (as are those in the Pipera-Tunari area). It is also home to many villas constructed before the 1930s that were refurbished in the 1990s and 2000s.

Băneasa is linked by RATB bus lines to the Bucharest city center. There is currently a proposal to construct an extension of the Bucharest Metro to serve this district and its increasing population.

Districts of Bucharest